Callionima inuus is a species of moth in the family Sphingidae. It was described by Walter Rothschild and Karl Jordan in 1903.

Distribution 
It is known from Mexico, Belize, Guatemala, Nicaragua, Costa Rica and Panama through Venezuela to Paraguay, Bolivia, Brazil, Argentina and Peru.

Description 
The wingspan is 67–72 mm. Adults are on wing year round.

Biology 
The larvae probably feed on Tabernaemontana alba and other Apocynaceae species.

References

i
Moths of Central America
Sphingidae of South America
Taxa named by Walter Rothschild
Moths described in 1903